Joannes Baptista Dolar ( or Janez Kersnik Dolar, also Tollar or Thollary;  1620, Kamnik – 1673, Vienna) was a composer and contemporary of Heinrich Ignaz Franz von Biber, Johann Heinrich Schmelzer, Andreas Hofer and Pavel Josef Vejvanovský.

Dolar composed some large-scale instrumental and vocal works, notably:

 Sonata à 13: 2 Violini, 2 Viole, Fagotto, 2 Clarini, 2 Cornetti, 4 Tromboni, Violone & Organo.
 Miserere mei Deus: SATB, SATB in concerto, SATB, SATB in cappella, 2 Violini, 2 Viole, 2 Clarini, 2 Cornetti Muti, 3 Tromboni, Violone & Organo.
 Missa Viennensis: SSSSAAAATTTTBBBB in concerto, SATB in cappella, 2 Cornetti, 2 Clarini, 4 Tromboni, Fagotto, 3 Violini, 2 Violae, Violoncello, Violone, Organo.

References

 

1620s births
1673 deaths
17th-century Carniolan people
17th-century classical composers
Baroque composers
Carniolan Jesuits
Carniolan composers
Slovenian expatriates in Austria
People from Kamnik
Male classical composers
17th-century male musicians